Leucocoprinus cretaceus is a species of mushroom producing fungus in the family Agaricaceae. It is likely tropical in origin although it was first documented in Europe where it was often found growing in greenhouses and bark beds. However many early observations conflate this species with Leucocoprinus birnbaumii or Leucocoprinus cepistipes despite sharing only some superficial similarities. This fungus is quite versatile even for a saprotroph and is often found growing in clusters on woodchips, sawdust and compost heaps as well as directly from the ground or on trees. It may also appear in plant pots and greenhouses in colder countries in which it is not well equipped to survive outside.

Taxonomy 
The species was first described as Agaricus cretaceus by the French botanist Jean Baptiste François Pierre Bulliard in 1788. Bulliard produced a spectacular illustration of L'Agaric Cretacé' in one of his numerous volumes of 'Herbier de la France' and described the mushroom as fluffy and as white as chalk. He noted that the mushrooms appeared in July and August and that he had only ever found them in hot greenhouses and planters under cold frames. He claimed that the mushrooms were very pleasant to taste and smell. His illustration however may be more consistent with Leucocoprinus cepistipes.

In 1836 the species was classified as Pluteus cretaceus by the Swedish mycologist Elias Magnus Fries from observations made around Lund, Sweden in the Autumn but the habitat was not specified. Fries also noted that these mushrooms were tastier than others and suggested the Swedish common name Krithvita champignonen which translates as 'chalk white mushroom'.

In 1871 the German mycologist Paul Kummer classified it as Psalliota cretacea and noted that it occurred in grassy places in Germany but was not common. He suggested the German common name of Kreideweißer champignon which likewise translates as 'chalk white mushroom'.

In 1878 the French mycologist Claude Casimir Gillet classified it as Pratella cretacea. The species was described as growing in gardens, vineyards and cultivated fields in France during the Summer and Autumn. Gillet agreed with Bulliard's assessment of the flavour as pleasant and stated it was an edible mushroom.

In 1887 the Italian mycologist Pier Andrea Saccardo classified it as a variant of Lepiota cepaestipes (now Leucocopinus cepistipes) whilst also describing Lepiota lutea (now Leucocoprinus birnbaumii) as another variant.

In 1898 the Italian botanist and mycologist Oreste Mattirolo classified it as Lepiota cretacea.in 1898 the German botanist Otto Kuntze proposed major reclassifications in his book entitled 'Revisio generum plantarum and suggested that Michel Adanson's pre-Linnaean system genus Fungus should be resurrected for numerous Agaricus and Stropharia species with Fungus cretaceus being one of the new combinations created. Like many of Kuntze's propositions from this book, the idea was not adopted and nothing remains in the Fungus genus.

It was classified as Lepiota cretacea by Italian mycologist Oreste Mattirolo in 1918 and Leucoagaricus cretaceus by the Austrian mycologist Meinhard Michael Moser in 1953.

In 1945 it was reclassified as Leucocoprinus cretaceus by the French mycologist Marcel Locquin.

Description 
Leucocoprinus cretaceus is a small dapperling mushroom with white flesh and a distinctively warty cap.

Cap: 2–8 cm. Bulbous when immature becoming convex or flat as it grows and ages. It is stark white and covered in warts. Stem: 3–8 cm in height. 5-10mm thick. Tapers upwards from a swollen base which may exhibit similar warty scales. Fragile stem ring. Gills: White, free and crowded. Spore print: White to creamy white. Spores: Subamygdaliform or Ellipsoid. Smooth with a small pore. Dextrinoid. 6-12 x 4-7 μm. Smell: Indistinct.

Habitat and distribution 
Leucocoprinus cretaceus is documented growing in plant pots and greenhouses and so may have a worldwide distribution in captivity with introduction into the wild being possible where temperatures are suitable for these tropical species. In a 1907 study the American mycologist Andrew Price Morgan documented Lepiota cretacea growing in 'rich soil in gardens' and in hot beds throughout North America.

It is widespread in tropical areas, and has a scattered distribution in South America. Five species of Leucocoprinus collected recently in Northern Argentina and Paraguay were identified. Four of them (L. birnbaumii, L. cepistipes, L. cretaceous, and L. straminellus) were reported for the first time in Paraguay and later, three (Leucocoprinus birnbaumi, L. cepistipes, and L. straminellus) were reported in northeastern Argentina.

Etymology 
The specific epithet cretaceus means chalky and comes from the Latin creta for chalk.

References

External links

Fungi described in 1788
Fungi of Africa
Fungi of Asia
Fungi of Europe
Fungi of North America
Taxa named by Jean Baptiste François Pierre Bulliard
Leucocoprinus
Taxa named by Marcel Locquin